Thomas Whitmore (c. 1742–1795), was a British soldier and politician who sat in the House of Commons for 24 years from 1771 to 1795.
 
Whitmore was the son of Charles Whitmore a wine merchant of Southampton and  his wife Mary Kelly. He joined the army and was Ensign in the 9th Foot in 1759. In 1761 was serving in the Grenadier Guards. He became  captain in the 9th  Foot in  1762 and  major in 1767. He married firstly his cousin Mary Whitmore daughter of Thomas Whitmore of Apley, formerly MP, in June 1770.

In 1771 Whitmore was elected in a by-election as Member of Parliament for Bridgnorth, where a Whitmore was usually MP over two centuries. He succeeded to his uncle's estate at Apley Hall in 1773 and retired from the army. By 1774 he was his own patron and his election was unopposed in the 1774 general election. His first wife died in 1776 and he married again in January 1780 to Mary Foley, daughter of Captain Thomas Foley RN of Stockton, Shropshire. He was returned again as MP for Bridgnorth and also for Much Wenlock in 1780 but chose to sit for Bridgnorth. Subsequently, he was a member of the St. Alban's Tavern group which tried to bring together Pitt and Fox. He was returned for Bridgnorth again in 1784  and 1790.

Whitmore died aged 52 on 17 April 1795.

References

Sources

1795 deaths
British MPs 1768–1774
British MPs 1774–1780
British MPs 1780–1784
British MPs 1784–1790
British MPs 1790–1796
Members of the Parliament of Great Britain for English constituencies
Year of birth uncertain